The Dnipropetrovsk Regional Committee of the Communist Party of Ukraine, commonly referred to as the Dnipropetrovsk CPU obkom, was the position of highest authority in the Dnipropetrovsk Oblast, in the Ukrainian SSR of the Soviet Union. The position was created on February 27, 1932, and abolished in August 1991. The First Secretary was a de facto appointed position usually by the Central Committee of the Communist Party of Ukraine or the First Secretary of the Republic.

List of First Secretaries of the Communist Party of Dnipropetrovsk Region

See also
Dnipropetrovsk Oblast

Notes

Sources
 World Statesmen.org

Regional Committees of the Communist Party of Ukraine (Soviet Union)
Ukrainian Soviet Socialist Republic
History of Dnipropetrovsk Oblast
1932 establishments in the Soviet Union
1991 disestablishments in the Soviet Union